is a passenger railway station  located in the city of   Nishinomiya Hyōgo Prefecture, Japan. It is operated by the private transportation company Hanshin Electric Railway.

Lines

Layout
The station consists of a two bay platforms.

Adjacent stations

History
Mukogawadanchimae Station opened on the Hanshin Mukogawa Line on 3 April 1984.

Passenger statistics
In fiscal 2019, the station was used by an average of 3,866 passengers daily

Surrounding area
Mukogawa Housing Complex
Nishinomiya Municipal Takasu Public Hall
Nishinomiya City Hall Naruo Branch Takasu Branch
Nishinomiya City Central Library Takasu Branch
Nishinomiya Municipal Naruo Minami Junior High School

See also
List of railway stations in Japan

References

External links

   

Railway stations in Japan opened in 1984
Railway stations in Hyōgo Prefecture
 Nishinomiya